Legislative elections were held in France on 22 September and 6 October 1889, during the Boulanger affair. It resulted in a victory for the Republicans, and a thorough defeat for the Boulangists.

Results

See also
1889 French legislative election in Algeria

External links
Map of Deputies elected in 1889 according to their group in the House, including overseas (in french)

Legislative elections in France
France
Legislative
France
France